The Dardanelle Commercial Historic District encompasses the part of the historic central business district of Dardanelle, Arkansas.  The district extends along Front Street, from Pine Street in the north to nearly Oak Street in the south, and includes some properties on adjacent cross streets.  Although this area has been commercially active since the 1820s (initially as a steamboat port on the Arkansas River), its present architecture reflects the late 19th and early 20th centuries, with modestly scaled one and two story masonry building predominating.

The district was listed on the National Register of Historic Places in 2009.  Buildings separately listed on the National Register include the Dardanelle Agriculture and Post Office, and the First Presbyterian Church.

See also
National Register of Historic Places listings in Yell County, Arkansas

References

Historic districts on the National Register of Historic Places in Arkansas
National Register of Historic Places in Yell County, Arkansas
Gothic Revival architecture in Arkansas
Commercial buildings completed in 1891
Buildings designated early commercial in the National Register of Historic Places in Arkansas